Palm Beach United is an American women's soccer team based in West Palm Beach, Florida. Founded in 2005, it is currently a member of the Women's Premier Soccer League (WPSL), at the second tier of women's soccer in the United States and Canada. It plays in the Sunshine Conference.

The team was founded by the Palm Beach United Football Club in 2005, but in 2011 was adopted by the Delray Beach Athletic Club. The team's colors are red and white.

Players

Year-by-year

Honors

Competition history

Coaches
  Brad Partridge 2006; 2008–2010
  Asaf Lubezky 2007
  Steve Burgess 2011

Stadia
 Buttonwood Soccer Complex, Lake Worth, Florida 2007
 Stadium at Emerald Cove Middle School, Wellington, Florida 2008 (1 game)
 Stadium at Palm Beach Central High School, West Palm Beach, Florida 2008–2009
 Okaheelee Park, West Palm Beach, Florida 2010
 Lockhart Stadium, Fort Lauderdale, Florida 2011
 Seacrest Soccer Complex, Delray Beach, Florida 2011

Average attendance

External links
 Official website
 WPSL Palm Beach United page

   

Women's Premier Soccer League teams
Women's soccer clubs in the United States
Soccer clubs in Miami
Association football clubs established in 2005
2005 establishments in Florida
Sports in Palm Beach County, Florida